Austrothrips is a genus of thrips in the family Phlaeothripidae.

Species
 Austrothrips cochinchinensis
 Austrothrips flavitibia
 Austrothrips vanuaensis
 Austrothrips verae

References

Phlaeothripidae
Thrips
Thrips genera